Lucid Design Group, Inc. (Lucid) is an Oakland, California-based company which offers building analytics. The company was started by John Petersen, Vladi Shunturov,  Michael Murray and Gavin Platt in 2004. The company's "Building Dashboard" provides real-time, web-based feedback on electric, gas, and water usage within buildings.

In February 2018, Lucid was acquired by Acuity Brands, Inc.

References

American companies established in 2004